Emmanuel-Marie-Stanislas Thibaut de La Rochethulon (1832–1890) was a French politician. He served as a member of the Chamber of Deputies from 1871 to 1876.

References

1832 births
1890 deaths
Politicians from Orléans
Legitimists
Members of the National Assembly (1871)
French military personnel of the Franco-Prussian War
Chevaliers of the Légion d'honneur